Nahajir (also, Nahadzir, Nahajir and Nəhəcir) is a village and municipality in the Babek District of Nakhchivan, Azerbaijan. It is located 22 km in the north from the district center, on the foothill area. Its population is busy with farming and animal husbandry. There are secondary school, club, two library and a medical center in the village. It has a population of 514. Until 6 January 2015, it belonged to the neighbouring Julfa District.

Etymology
The name is the distorted form of the name of the Persian word نخجیر Nakhjir which means "hunting area". According to those researchers that meaning is related  with the figures of the natural rams in the territory of the village.

Historical and archaeological monuments

Nahajir Fortress
Nahajir Fortress - the fortress of the end of the 2nd millennium BC in the flat area on the southern part of the tall and steep rocky of the same named mountain, nearby Nahajir village of Babek rayon. The Fortress was discovered by the Nakhchivan archaeological expedition (2001). From its territory have been found the axe made of basalt stone, stone pestle in small size, pottery fragments in black, gray and pink colored of the same period. And from destroyed barrow which is contemporary with Nahajir fortress have been found mono chrome painted potteries of the beginning of the 2nd millennium BC. The cyclopes-type defensive walls were built of large rocks on the southern and eastern slopes of the mountain, on the terraces. The width of its walls are 2–2.5 m. The fortress was built to protect from attacks of enemies, by the ancient tribes who developed in cultural aspect and lived on the plain in south slope of the Nahajir Mountain.

Nahajir I
Nahajir I - the place of residence of the Bronze Age in the north-east of Nahajir village of Babek rayon. It is limited by the Nahajir Mount from the north and by the Nahajir village from the south. Its area is 10 hectares. The  thickness of cultural layer is 3 m. From the place of residence were discovered the fragments of the clay pot in monochrome painted in gray and black colored, grain stones, graters and pestle. On one of the glazed monochrome plates found from the place of residence was described  painted with black paint a man holding from cord attached to neck of a small animal. The posture of the man on the painting is such that it is hard to imagine the basic economic - domestic scene in here. The most important thing is that the man's hands rose up to the sky. This rite is likely shows faith of the tribes Azerbaijan of the middle Bronze Age. The scene of rite is similar to the Gamigaya drawings. Based on an analysis of the findings, experts, is believed that people have started to settle in this territory which is located in the favorable geographical and strategic position in the end of the third millennium BC.

Nahajir Necropolis I
Nahajir Necropolis I - the archaeological monument of the Bronze Age in the north end of the settlement of the Nahajir I. From the stone and soil barrows were obtained a monochrome colored hilts, scratching and embossed patterned gray and black potteries which is typical for the first phase of the culture (22nd–18th centuries BC) of Colored Plates of Azerbaijan. The monochrome plates were decorated with broken and wavy lines, geometric shapes (triangle, circle, etc.), drawings of people and animals. The images of the animals, birds and people on the colored plates is similar to the drawings of Gamigaya in its size, schematic and motive.

Nahajir II
Nahajir II - the archaeological monument of the Middle Ages in the west of the Nahajir village of Babek rayon. The monument is limited from the north by the Nahajir Mountain and stretch towards from the north to the east along through its slope  in narrow strip form. It was recorded by the archaeological expedition of Nakhchivan Regional Scientific Center in 1991. The exploration research works were carried out. In the place of residence have been found the remains of building, the big hillock of the ash in two places, were collected the jug in pink colored, the glazed and unglazed ceramic pieces (decorated with geometric and floral patterns).

Nahajir Necropolis II
Nahajir Necropolis II - the archaeological monument of the Middle Ages on the west side of the Nahajir II settlement, on an oblong hill. The graves in the necropolis directed from the west to the east. There have been a lot of stone ram figures of natural size (15th-16th centuries). On the gravestone monuments were decorated with different sign and paintings.

References 

Populated places in Babek District